Pacific Lutheran University (PLU) is a private Lutheran university in Parkland, Washington. It was founded by Norwegian Lutheran immigrants in 1890. PLU is sponsored by the 580 congregations of Region I of the Evangelical Lutheran Church in America. PLU has approximately 2,700 students enrolled. As of 2023, the school employs approximately 238 full-time professors on the  woodland campus.

PLU’s academic programs into four colleges: the College of Health Professions; the College of Humanities, Interdisciplinary Studies, and Social Sciences; the College of Natural Sciences; and the College of Professional Studies.

History

Early years 
The university was chartered by the State of Washington on December 11, 1890. In naming the university, the Norwegian immigrants who founded it recognized the role that a Lutheran educational institution on the Western frontier could play in the region. They wanted the institution to help immigrants adjust to their new land and find jobs, but they also wanted it to produce graduates who would serve church and community. Education—and educating for service—was a venerated part of the Scandinavian traditions from which these pioneers came.

Classes first began in 1894 with the student body consisting of 30 students. Tuition at the time cost $1 per week. Bjug Harstad was the school's first president. The entire university was housed in one building from 1894 to 1912. This building was formerly known as Old Main but has since been renamed Harstad Hall in honor of the school's founding president.

In 1898, the university's name was changed to Pacific Lutheran Academy and Business College. Attempting to eliminate the debt plaguing the school, Bjug Harstad left for Alaska to search for gold. He spent one and one half years there but was unable to discover any gold. In 1902, the PLA athletic club celebrated its first victory in men's basketball with a 15–12 win over the University of Washington. Five years later women would be allowed to play basketball.

In 1912, a second building, a gymnasium, was constructed on the university campus. It included a track, a stage, and a science laboratory in the basement. Two years later students built a tennis court in what is now Red Square. By 1914, PLA received full accreditation meaning students could transfer to universities and retain their credits.

Although founded as a university, the institution functioned primarily as an academy until 1918, when it suspended instruction for two years. It reopened as the two-year Pacific Lutheran College, after merging with Columbia College, previously located in Everett. Further consolidations occurred when Spokane College merged with PLC in 1929. Four-year baccalaureate degrees were first offered in education in 1939 and in the liberal arts in 1942. The institution was reorganized as a university in 1960, reclaiming its original name.

Pacific Lutheran College 

In 1920, the school merged with Columbia College in Everett, Washington, and reopened as Pacific Lutheran College. The reopening of the school also saw the construction of a new building, the chapel. Classes were held in the chapel until 1967. The chapel was also the home of Trinity Lutheran Church until the congregation built its own church in 1937.

The school's first football team was launched in 1926. They were originally known as the "Greyhounds", then the "Gladiators" (although they are unofficially referred to as the "Lutes"). That same year Polly Langlow, a member of PLC's women's basketball team, scored 270 points in 12-games setting a national record. A year later in 1927 the college's great musical tradition, the Choir of the West, was founded. The Choir acquired its name on a trip to the Great Lakes region.

Another merger occurred in 1929 when Spokane College, another Northwest Norwegian Lutheran school, closed. Its academic records were merged with PLC's, and several of its faculty members came to PLC. In 1937 the university acquired the golf course through a generous donation. The same year the cornerstone was laid for the new library. 1939 saw the first of several visits by Norwegian royalty when Crown Prince Olav and Crown Princess Märtha came to PLC's campus.

During the early 1940s, PLC's student body was almost all female as most men were fighting in World War II. People returning to college post-war, specifically veterans using the G.I. Bill, caused a boom in enrollment. The student body at that time was half veteran and no longer mostly female. A number of new buildings were completed in the following years including Ramstad Hall, Memorial Gymnasium, and the Student Union Building (now renamed as Anderson University Center). In 1952 the new Chapel-Music-Speech Building was constructed and later named Eastvold Chapel (renamed in 2013 as the Karen Hille Phillips Center for the Performing Arts). Chapel became mandatory for the first time with attendance being taken and seats being assigned. Two years later North and South Halls, the first dormitories, were built (later renamed Hong Hall and Hinderlie Hall, respectively.) Until that time students had lived in Old Main or boarded with Parkland families.

University status 
Reclaiming the original name, Pacific Lutheran College became known as Pacific Lutheran University in 1960. Along with the name of the school being changed the PLU mascot was also changed from the Gladiators to the Knights. The 1960s saw decade-long construction boom as ten buildings were built by 1970, almost as many as had been built in the previous 70 years.

The 1960s and 1970s were a time of great change on PLU's campus when restrictions on student life began to loosen. Chapel was no longer required and two dormitories become coed. Girls' dormitories' restrictive hours were replaced with a card-key system, and opposite-sex visitation was allowed 3 times a week instead of 2 times a year. Dancing was allowed for the first time on campus in 1963. Several well known entertainers performed at PLU including Louis Armstrong, Ray Charles, The Steve Miller Band, The Righteous Brothers, B.B. King, Ike & Tina Turner, Bob Hope and The Psychedelic Furs performing hits 'Pretty in Pink' and 'Heartbreak Beat'.

Throughout its history PLU has remained close to its Scandinavian roots. In 1975 the school played host to King Olav V of Norway. Three years later in 1978, 14 members of Stortinget, the Norwegian Parliament, visited PLU. In 1982 King Carl XVI Gustav and Queen Silvia of Sweden visited PLU and the following year Princess Astrid of Norway also paid a visit to the university. That same year a monument was erected in Valle, Norway, to honor the Rev. Bjug Harstad, founder of PLU. By 1989 a Scandinavian Cultural Center would be completed on the lower floor of the University Center. King Harald V and Queen Sonja of Norway came to PLU in 1995 with Queen Sonja receiving an honorary Doctorate of Humane Letters. Crown Prince Haakon of Norway visited PLU in 1999. To mark its 125th anniversary in 2015, PLU awarded an honorary Doctor of Laws degree upon King Harald V of Norway.

Presidents
The first President of the Pacific Lutheran University was Rev. Bjug Harstad. The entire university was housed in one building from 1894 to 1912. This building was formerly known as Old Main but has since been renamed Harstad Hall in honor of the founding president.

The 14th and current President of the Pacific Lutheran University is L. Allan Belton, appointed in 2017.

AAUP censure
In June 2020, PLU was added to the American Association of University Professors (AAUP) list of censured administrations. An AAUP report  found that a long-serving PLU faculty member had been dismissed in violation of the AAUP's 1940 Statement of Principles on Academic Freedom and Tenure.

Reductions and reallocations
In April 2021, the Board of Regents at PLU announced its approval for cuts to 36 full-time faculty equivalent (FTE) positions, which will include some tenured faculty members losing their positions. The university also will discontinue two majors (German, Nordic Studies), four minors (Classical Studies, Norwegian, German), and one master's program (Master of Science in Finance). The cuts also affected various programs in other ways. For example, some departments, including anthropology, lost so many faculty that they had to give up their majors. All cuts will be implemented beginning with the Fall 2022 semester. This budget reduction is expected to save between $2.5 million and $4 million.

The cuts announced in April 2021 follow cuts of about 31 FTE faculty announced during the 2017–2018 academic year, with savings of around $2.8 million. Cuts announced in 2018 also affected some majors and minors. PLU had 376 faculty members in September 2017. More than 1 in 6 FTE faculty positions (67 positions) will have been eliminated as a result of the cuts announced in 2017-2018 and April 2021. The faculty cuts announced in 2017-2018 were made largely through attrition or enticing professors close to retirement to retire early, whereas the cuts announced in April 2021 will involve more involuntary cuts, with some tenured and tenure-track and most contingent professors involuntarily losing their jobs.

Admission and financial aid 
Tuition for the 2019–20 school year is $43,264 with room and meals costing $10,876. More than 97 percent of PLU students receive some sort of financial support. The 2020 U.S. News College and University rankings listed PLU as the seventh most innovative school, ninth best undergraduate teaching, and tenth best value school in the west region.

The 2019–2020 student body is as follows: 64 percent female, 36 percent male; 41 percent are students of color; 75 percent are from Washington state; 13 percent are Lutheran; 3 percent are international students representing 23 countries.

Academics 
The academic calendar at PLU is divided into two semesters, fall and spring, with a one-month term during January known as J-term. Summer classes are also offered. During J-term students take one class for the entire month of January which counts as a normal 4-credit class one would take during a semester. PLU offers 44 majors and 54 minors in a wide array of disciplines.

New American University 
PLU is a member of The New American Colleges and Universities, a national consortium of 22 selective, medium-sized (2,000–7,500 students) independent colleges and universities dedicated to the purposeful integration of liberal education, professional studies, and civic engagement.

This type of institution was called a New American College by Ernest Boyer in a series of influential essays and speeches in the 1990s. Since Boyer coined this term, most of the institutions that have aligned with this identity are referred to as universities; so, the term has tended to become New American University.

Study away
In 2009, PLU received the Senator Paul Simon Award for Campus Internationalization. In the same year PLU matched a $1 million grant from the Bill & Melinda Gates Foundation to create an endowment to assist low-income students to participate in study away programs. The Wang Center for International Programs opened in 2002 as the result of a $4 million donation from Peter, a 1960 PLU graduate, and Grace Wang. PLU maintains a partnership with Sichuan University, a university on the Entity List of the United States Department of Commerce's Bureau of Industry and Security. Nearly 50% of PLU students study away.

Campus
The Pacific Lutheran University campus is located six miles (10 km) south of Tacoma, Washington, in suburban Parkland, on a 156-acre (63 ha) woodland campus. Joint Base Lewis-McChord is less than a half-mile (800 m) west of Parkland. The campus is unofficially divided into two sections, upper campus and lower campus.

Upper campus is home to many of the academic and administration buildings including the Phillip Hauge Administration Building, Mortvedt Library, Ramstad Hall and Xavier Hall. In 1964, the Board of Regents engaged Richard Haag—'the father of Northwest Landscape Architecture'—to design the landscape architecture plan for upper campus. Haag is famous for his work on Gas Works Park in Seattle, Washington and on the Bloedel Reserve on Bainbridge Island as well as the Seattle Center.

The Mortvedt Library offers over 260,000 volumes of books as well as over 23,000 full-text journals. The oldest book in the PLU collection is a psalter by Johann Bugenhagen published in 1524. Built in 1937, Xavier Hall served as the library until the Mortvedt Library was built in 1967. Since then the Division of Social Sciences has been housed in Xavier. In 2000 Xavier underwent a $5 million renovation project that saw the addition of the Philip Nordquist Lecture Hall. The University Center is also located on upper campus. This building houses the all-campus cafeteria, called the University Commons, and the Old Main Market. In addition it houses the offices of Campus Ministry, Student Involvement and Leadership, Residential Life, the Diversity Center, the Scandinavian Center, Student Media, Residence Hall Association, the Associated Students of PLU (ASPLU), Dining Services, Conferences and Events, and the Chris Knutzen Lecture Hall.

Along with the academic and administration buildings upper campus also houses PLU's art programs. The Mary Baker Russell Music Center was built in 1997 and is the home of PLU's Department of Music. The acoustically impressive and well-known Lagerquist Concert Hall houses the Gottfried and Mary Fuchs Organ (the largest University-based mechanical action organ on the West Coast) as well as state-of-the-art practice and performance facilities. Ingram Hall is home to a communication computer lab, a digital photography/graphic design lab, and studio art classrooms for painting, ceramics, sculpture, photography and printmaking. Ingram boasts two galleries: the University Gallery (which houses major shows and exhibitions) and the Wekell Gallery (which generally houses student and class work). Eastvold Auditorium, formal called Eastvold Chapel, seats 1100 and is the home of PLU Theatre. Eastvold hosts all main stage productions as well as a range of smaller productions throughout the year. In October 2011, PLU Theatre premiered a new addition to its arts department, the Karen H. Phillips Center for the Performing Arts. Named after the former Regent, this space is a symbol of the completion of phase one in Eastvold Auditorium's renovations. Eastvold is set to reopen with a new performing arts center in the fall of 2013.

Lower campus is home to many of the university's athletic facilities. These include Olson Auditorium, Memorial Gymnasium, Names Fitness Center, and the university swimming pool. Also located on lower campus are the Rieke Science Center, Morken Center for Learning and Technology, Martin J. Neeb Building, and the Keck Observatory.

Additional buildings around the perimeter of campus are also used for University purposes, including offices, the Wang Center for International Studies, East Campus, the Women's Center, the University House and Trinity Lutheran Church.

Residential life
PLU requires that all students under 20 years of age or junior status on or before September 1 live on campus or at home with a parent, spouse or child. Approximately half of all students enrolled at PLU live on campus. There are ten residence halls at PLU, with six located on upper campus and four located on lower campus.

Every year, the PLU Football team helps move new students into their PLU home.

The ten on campus residence halls: 
 Harstad Hall, built in 1894, is the oldest building on campus and housed the entire university from 1894 to 1912. It became a residence hall in 1960. It is an all-female hall, the only single sex hall on campus. Harstad is five stories tall and houses approximately 200 female residents. In 1984 the building was listed on the National Register of Historic Places.
 Hinderlie Hall, built in 1954, Hinderlie Hall was first named South Hall but changed to Hinderlie in 1966 in honor of Berent and Ragna Hinderlie, university staff members between 1923 and 1955. The hall is four stories tall, with resident rooms on each floor including the south side of the basement, which is open to the hillside. Approximately 130 residents reside in Hinderlie.
 Hong International Hall, built in 1954, was originally named North Hall. In 1966 the building was renamed in honor of Nils Joseph Hong, president from 1898 until 1918 and a faculty member at Pacific Lutheran College until he retired in 1938. The hall has five language wings (Norwegian, Chinese, French, German, and Spanish) and the International Honors wing. Approximately 75 residents reside in Hong.
 Kreidler Hall, built in 1957, was originally named West Hall. In 1966 the hall was renamed Kreidler Hall after Lora Bradford Kreidler, the Dean of Women and teacher of arts from 1921 to 1943. All rooms in Kreidler are single rooms and students must be 20 years of age or junior standing to reside in Kreidler. Approximately 65 students reside in Kreidler.
 Stuen Hall, built in 1966, is named after Ole J. Stuen, faculty member and administrator from 1913 to 1952. Approximately 100 residents reside in Stuen.
 Ordal Hall, built in 1967, is named in honor of Ola J. Ordal, president of Pacific Lutheran College from 1921 to 1928. The Hall was originally built to house 187 female students but has since become co-ed.
 Pflueger Hall, built in 1962, was the first residence hall built on lower campus. The building is named after Jesse P. Pflueger, professor of religion and philosophy from 1930 to 1958. It was designed to be a three-story hall to house 212 men, but since then has been converted to house both men and women.
 Foss Hall, built in 1965, is named after Rev. Halfdan L. Foss, chairman of the Pacific Lutheran Board of Trustees from 1942 to 1964. The hall originally housed 188 men but has since become co-ed. It was taken offline after Spring 2015.
 Tingelstad Hall, built in 1967, was originally designed to house 396 men but has since then become co-ed. The hall was named to honor Oscar A. Tingelstad, president of Pacific Lutheran College from 1928 to 1943. Standing nine stories tall Tingelstad is the tallest building in Parkland. The hall is divided into four houses, Alpine, Cascade, Evergreen and Ivy with every two floors sharing a common lounge.
 South Hall, built in 2000, is an apartment-style complex located on the south edge of campus. Students must be 20-years of age or junior standing to reside in South.

Commitment to sustainability
PLU has a long history of being committed to a sustainable campus and leading the way as an example for institutions around the world. A certification program in environmental studies was developed in the 1970s, and a major was established in the 1990s. On April 22, 2004, PLU President Loren Anderson signed the Talloires Declaration, making PLU the first Pacific Northwest University to sign the declaration. Leading the nation as a charter signatory to the American College and University presidents Climate Commitment in 2007, PLU accepted the challenge, showing commitment to achieving carbon neutrality. The agreement called for universities to reduce greenhouse gas emissions, but PLU has taken the initiative to set their goal of becoming carbon neutral by December 31, 2020. The 2015 edition of The Princeton Review's Guide to 353 Green Colleges recognized PLU as a green college leader. Highlights of the review include PLU dining services using 25 percent of its food budget to buy local and/or organic food and 95 percent of the products used by the cleaning services crew being Green Seal Certified.

PLU is currently in the process of remodeling and reconstructing multiple buildings throughout campus. The goal is for each building to obtain a Leadership in Energy and Environmental Design (LEED) rating of Gold. Currently two buildings have been awarded a Gold rating by LEED. In 2006 the Morken Center for Learning and Technology became the first building to earn the award. The Morken Building is home to the School of Business and the Computer Science department. This , $21 million building requires no fossil fuel to operate and is heated and cooled by using a geothermal heat-pump system that regulates its temperature with water stored in 85 wells located 300 feet (100 m) underground. In 2009 a second building would earn the LEED Gold rating when the Martin J. Neeb Center was completed. This building was home to the radio station 88.5 KPLU and at the time of the award being presented it was the only radio facility in the nation with a LEED Gold ranking. The University Center was the third building to receive a LEED rating. Following the completion of the 2006–2007 academic year, the University Center underwent $14 million in construction renovations and as a result earned a LEED Silver rating.

As of 2013, PLU diverted more than 70% of its waste. For its record on sustainability, the university was recognized with a Gold Award from the Association for the Advancement of Sustainability in Higher Education (AASHE). In 2008, a student-led initiative brought awareness about saving money by consuming tap water instead of buying bottled water. Bottled water is not sold in campus restaurants as a result of the student-run initiative in 2011. All of the programs in the PLU Sustainability Office are student-led i.e. Bike Coop, Community Garden, surPLUs store, and habitat restoration.

Student activities

Music
PLU's instrumental groups include the University Symphony Orchestra, Wind Ensemble, Concert Band, Jazz Ensemble, Jazz Combo, and Chamber Music. Along with these groups the university has a variety of vocal groups which include the Choir of the West, University Chorale, University Singers, University Men's Chorus, Choral Union, and Chapel Choir.

The Mast
The Mast is PLU's student-run newspaper. It was first printed in 1924 in the basement of the university chapel. It is now a converged media group which includes Mast TV and Lute Air Student Radio. It was originally named "The Mooring Mast", but was changed in Fall 2015 to simply "The Mast." The unusual, original name "The Mooring Mast" came from the USS Shenandoah, a U.S. Navy airship. In nearby Fort Lewis there was a large mooring structure for the airship and the students derived the name from this in honor of the famed ship.

Army ROTC
PLU has a US Army Reserve Officer Training Corps (ROTC) detachment that each year commissions officers into the active Army, Army National Guard and Army Reserve. In addition to Army scholarships, PLU provides a room and board scholarship. The Lute Battalion of Army ROTC won the McArthur Award—the highest award available—in 2010, 2012 and 2013.

KPLU-FM

KPLU-FM (88.5 MHz) is a news and jazz format National Public Radio member station that was owned by Pacific Lutheran University. While PLU held the license for the radio station and all KPLU staff members were also university employees, the university took a hands-off approach to on-air content. PLU supported the station with infrastructure amounting to more than $1.5 million annually.

Sale of KPLU 
On November 12, 2015, it was announced to KPLU staff that PLU intended to sell the radio station to the University of Washington, which already operated KUOW. On May 26, 2016, Friends of 88.5 FM announced that they had raised $7 million to match the offer made by the University of Washington. On June 28, 2016, PLU announced that it had reached an agreement to transfer the license for 88.5 FM to Friends of 88.5 FM. The sale was consummated on August 30, 2016.

Athletics
PLU is a member of National Collegiate Athletic Association Division III, as well as the Northwest Conference. PLU has a rich tradition of athletic success: in the Northwest Conference, no other school has won the All-Sports Trophy as many times as PLU has. In 2014, PLU was honored as first recipient of Diversity Spotlight award for LGBTQ inclusion efforts by student-athletes.

PLU offers the following varsity sports: Baseball, Men's and Women's Basketball, Men's and Women's Cross Country, Football, Men's and Women's Golf, Women's Rowing, Men's and Women's Soccer, Softball, Men's and Women's Swimming, Men's and Women's Tennis, Men's and Women's Track and field, and Women's Volleyball. Along with these varsity sports PLU also offers Men's Rowing, both Men's and Women's Lacrosse and Ultimate Frisbee as club sports.

Traditions
During the academic processional at commencement, Processional of Joy by Dr. Lawrence J. Meyer is traditionally played by the University Symphony Orchestra. Composed as a unique ceremonial score in 1969, Processional of Joy has been played at each commencement since 1970.

Notable alumni

Athletics
 Lisa Cole, head coach of the Boston Breakers in the National Women's Soccer League
 Chris Egan, Emmy award-winning sports anchor/reporter for KING-TV
 Ken Flajole, National Football League coach, formerly the inside linebacker coach for the Cleveland Browns
 Craig Fouhy, sports broadcaster
 Marv Harshman, nation's winningest college basketball coach at the time of his retirement
 Doug Herland, rower and winner of bronze medal for the coxed pair at the 1984 Summer Olympics
 Megan Jendrick, swimmer, record holder, and winner of two gold medals at the 2000 Summer Olympics and a silver medal at the 2008 Summer Olympics
 Craig Kupp, former National Football League quarterback
 Don Poier, radio and television voice for the Vancouver and Memphis Grizzlies from 1995 to 2005
 Scott Squires, CFL football coach
 Kirk Talley, college football coach
 Marv Tommervik, professional football player and college coach
 John Zamberlin, former National Football League linebacker and head football coach at Central Washington University and Idaho State University

Art and music
 Crystal Aikin, gospel singer-songwriter and reality television personality
 Angela Meade, operatic soprano
 Marissa Meyer, writer of The Lunar Chronicles
 Aaron Padilla, artist and art educator
 Michael Peterson, country music artist
 Connor Trinneer, actor most notable for playing Commander 'Trip' Tucker in Star Trek: Enterprise

Business
 Brad Tilden, CEO of Alaska Airlines

Law and politics
 Joyce A. Barr, diplomat; Assistant Secretary of State for Administratio, and former ambassador to Namibia
 Lois Capps, former member of the United States House of Representatives from California's 22nd congressional district
Jane Gillette, dentist and member of the Montana House of Representatives
 Calvin Goings, youngest Washington state senator
 Rick Larsen, former member of the U.S. House of Representatives from Washington's 2nd congressional district
 Jack Metcalf, former member of the U.S. House of Representatives from Washington's 2nd congressional district
 John Nilson, Canadian politician; member of the Legislative Assembly of Saskatchewan.
 Sean Parnell, lawyer and former governor of Alaska
Jan Shabro, former member of the Washington House of Representatives for the 31st district

Science and medicine
 William Foege, director of U.S. Centers for Disease Control and the Carter Center; 2012 Presidential Medal of Freedom recipient
 Martin W. Johnson, marine biologist and author
 Gene Strandness, pioneer in the field of vascular surgery, and "founding father" of the University of Washington School of Medicine and Medical Center
 David B. Wake, professor of integrative biology at UC Berkeley and internationally respected expert on speciation
 Scott Ransom, partner in the Health & Life Sciences Advisory at Oliver Wyman; past president of the University of North Texas Health Science Center
 Neil L. Kelleher, Walter and Mary Elizabeth Glass Professor of Chemistry, Molecular Biosciences, and Medicine at Northwestern University

Other
 Lute Jerstad, mountaineer and mountain guide and one of the first Americans to climb Mount Everest
 Rosanna Pansino, YouTuber and cookbook author

References

External links

 Official website
 Official athletics website

 
Universities and colleges in Tacoma, Washington
Educational institutions established in 1890
Universities and colleges accredited by the Northwest Commission on Colleges and Universities
Private universities and colleges in Washington (state)
1890 establishments in Washington (state)